Poncione di Braga is a mountain of the Lepontine Alps, located in the canton of Ticino, Switzerland. It is located in the upper Valle Maggia, south of the Cristallina.

References

External links
 Poncione di Braga on Hikr

Mountains of the Alps
Mountains of Switzerland
Mountains of Ticino
Lepontine Alps